Talesh Mahalleh-ye Bahambar (also Romanized as Ţālesh Maḩalleh-ye Bahambar; also known as Goldasht and Ţālesh Maḩalleh) is a village in Ziabar Rural District, in the Central District of Sowme'eh Sara County, Gilan Province, Iran. At the 2006 census, its population was 124, in 30 families.

References 

Populated places in Sowme'eh Sara County